William Robert Casey (23 May 1918 – 3 March 1999) was an Irish sportsperson.  He played Gaelic football with his local club Dingle and later Lispole and was a member of the Kerry senior inter-county team from 1938 until 1949. His nephew Brian Mullins played with Dublin in the 1970s and 1980s winning 4 All Ireland titles. Both his sons Gearóid, Gabriel and Riobard played with Kerry at all levels.

References
 http://www.terracetalk.com/kerry-football/player/397/Bill-Casey

Lispole Gaelic footballers
Dingle Gaelic footballers
Kerry inter-county Gaelic footballers
Munster inter-provincial Gaelic footballers
Year of birth uncertain
1999 deaths
1918 births